Mirlović Polje is a village in Šibenik-Knin County, Croatia. The settlement is administered as a part of Ružić municipality. In the 2011 census, it had a total of 170 inhabitants.

References

Populated places in Šibenik-Knin County